"We Shall Overcome" is a protest song of the Civil Rights Movement.

We Shall Overcome may also refer to:

 We Shall Overcome (Pete Seeger album), an album by Pete Seeger
 We Shall Overcome (Bernie Sanders album), an album by Bernie Sanders
 We Shall Overcome: The Seeger Sessions, a studio album by Bruce Springsteen
 We Shall Overcome: Sacred Song on the Devil's Tongue, a book by Isaias Gamboa about the history of the song "We Shall Overcome"
 We Shall Overcome (film), a 2006 film